"Sokka irti" is a song by Finnish rapper Cheek. The song serves as the second single from Cheek's seventh studio album, also titled Sokka irti. The song peaked at number three on the Finnish Singles Chart in May 2012.  A music video was shot in Los Angeles and uploaded to YouTube on 15 April 2012.

Chart performance

References

2012 songs
2012 singles
Cheek (rapper) songs
Warner Music Group singles